Sadhu Babar Lathi (  "") is a Bengali drama film based on Sirshendu Mukherjee novel was released in 2008,directed by  Sanghita Banerjee,  the movie featured Ramaprasad Banik.

Plot
Nabin Saha gets a speak of a dead Sadhu Baba (Saint) from his uncle. He takes the stick with him for a journey. On the way a local crook Nemai Roy makes friend with Nabin. When he learns that Nabin would cross the haunted "Ghurbuner Math" alone with Rs. 30,000/- he plans to rob Nabin. He ties up with the dacoits. Sota Gunda and slowly misleads the simple Nabin toward his den. Meanwhile, Nabin's friend Jagai and Madai advance towards at the same "Ghurbuner Math" in search of a hidden treasure but sense something wrong. They cross the field to reach Harirpurer Kella (fort) to discover Nabin fighting the dacoits alone with Sadhu Baba's Stick. The three musketeers win the battle. But the dacoits send Nemai once again to steal the stick after knowing its supernatural prowess. When Nemai comes back to Nabin's village Haripur he reveals that the stick already become famous. Two other villainous people Hiru (a dacoit) and Panu (the local hoodlum) approach Nemai and threaten him to get the stick. Though after a lot of fuss Nemai manages to steal the stick from Nabin's courtyard, he can do nothing with it. In fact no one can bear fruits from it as all the three gangs clash with each other only to bash up themselves. Nabin, Jagai and Madai get back the stick and install it upon the grave of Sadhu Baba.

References

External links
Sadhu Babar Lathi on www.gomolo.in
www.telegraphindia.com preview

2008 films
Bengali-language Indian films
Films based on Indian novels
Films based on works by Shirshendu Mukhopadhyay
2000s Bengali-language films